The tornado outbreak of February 28 – March 1, 2017 was a widespread and significant outbreak of tornadoes and severe weather that affected the Midwestern United States at the end of February 2017 and beginning of March. Fueled by the combination of ample instability, strong wind shear, and rich low-level moisture, the event led to 71 confirmed tornadoes and thousands of other non-tornadic severe weather reports. The most notable aspect of the outbreak was a long-tracked EF4 tornado—the first violent tornado of 2017 and the first violent tornado during the month of February since the 2013 Hattiesburg, Mississippi tornado—that tracked from Perryville, Missouri to near Christopher, Illinois, killing one person. Three EF3 tornadoes were recorded during the event, including one that caused two fatalities in Ottawa, Illinois, one that caused a fatality near Crossville, and one that heavily damaged or destroyed homes in and around Washburn. In addition to the deaths, 38 people were injured by tornadoes and an additional 30 were injured by non-tornadic impacts, mainly by fallen trees.

Meteorological synopsis

The first indications of a severe weather event came on February 24, when the Storm Prediction Center (SPC) issued a threat area across Arkansas and portions of the lower Mississippi Valley valid for February 28. The threat level was maintained for Arkansas and surrounding states in the subsequent outlook, while a new risk area was introduced from northern Louisiana to southwestern Kentucky valid for March 1. Despite significant variance among model guidance, the SPC issued a day 3 Enhanced risk over the Ozark Plateau into southeastern Missouri, encompassed by much broader Slight and Marginal risk areas. The next day, an Enhanced risk was introduced portions of the Mid-South and Ohio River Valley in anticipation of a widespread damaging wind event on March 1. On February 28, the SPC introduced a Moderate risk of severe weather across portions of eastern Missouri, central and southern Illinois, central and southern Indiana, into western and northern Kentucky. The organization warned of supercell thunderstorm development and the potential for "nocturnal significant tornadoes." As the storm system spread east on March 1, a Moderate risk was briefly added across central Kentucky and middle Tennessee into the Cumberland Gap.

The setup for a widespread tornado outbreak came as a 115 mph (185 km/h) mid- to upper-level trough progressed eastward from the Great Basin and lower Colorado River Valley to the Mississippi Valley on February 28. With large-scale height falls, three rounds of severe weather were expected to evolve across the Midwestern United States: elevated thunderstorms across northern Illinois early in the day, significant supercell development throughout the evening and overnight hours, and a quasi-linear convective system throughout the overnight hours into March 1. At the surface, an area of low pressure developed near the Missouri–Iowa border and progressed into southern Michigan late on February 28. A cold front, meanwhile, extended from the Plains to the Mississippi Valley, and a warm front lifted northward across Illinois. In the warm sector ahead of the cold front, rich low-level moisture surged northward, with dewpoints of 65–70 °F (18–21 °C) observed across Texas and Louisiana. Although a strong subtropical jet stream allowed a widespread cirrus plume to overspread the risk area, limiting surface heating in some locations, mid-level CAPE values were still expected to reach upward of 1500–2000 J/kg. Combined with ample moisture, steep mid-level lapse rates, and sufficient destabilization, effective bulk shear near or over 80 mph (130 km/h), was expected to yield storm relative helicity values in excess of 300–400 m2/s2. However, the driving mechanism for convection across the risk area was still somewhat uncertain given the confluence of a weak capping inversion, warm-air advection, and negligible ascent.

The first signs of convective activity came around 19:45 UTC, when shallow cumulus development was observed across Arkansas. A half hour later, at 20:15 UTC, the SPC issued their first tornado watch across portions of Kansas, Missouri, and Illinois, the first of many watches issued throughout the afternoon and overnight hours. The first significant tornado touched down at 22:41 UTC, causing extensive damage along a path from Naplate to northwest of Marseilles, Illinois, most notably the city of Ottawa, with that tornado being rated EF3. There, two deaths were recorded and fourteen people were injured. Two other EF3 tornadoes were documented during the outbreak: one near Washburn, Illinois, and the other from Crossville, Illinois to Oakland City, Indiana that caused one fatality as well that traveled 44 miles and was produced by the same supercell as the Perryville tornado. In total, 72 tornadoes were confirmed during the outbreak. This outbreak would be followed by another outbreak which affected many of the same areas only 5 days later.

Confirmed tornadoes

February 28 event

March 1 event

Perryville, Missouri – Christopher, Illinois

The first EF4 tornado of 2017 began at 01:51 UTC on March 1 (7:51 p.m. CST on February 28) to the west of Perryville in Perry County, Missouri, where it snapped the trunks of several hardwood trees and caused EF1 damage to homes. An outbuilding was destroyed at EF2 intensity near the intersection of Country Road 810 and North Highway. The tornado then continued to the northeast and intensified at an exceptional rate, causing EF4 damage as it impacted a small subdivision of large homes on the west side of Interstate 55. Multiple two-story homes along Kyle Lane were completely leveled. One person was killed in their vehicle as the tornado crossed Interstate 55, and least a dozen cars were mangled and destroyed after being thrown  from a nearby salvage yard. The tornado then moved across a series of open pastures before crossing U.S. Route 61 and impacting the northwestern outskirts of Perryville at EF4 intensity. A residential subdivision along Moore Drive in this area sustained devastating damage, with many homes completely leveled, a few of which were swept clean from their foundations. Numerous trees in this area were snapped and denuded, and several vehicles were flipped and tossed. One home in this area was anchor-bolted to its foundation with its wall studs toe-nailed at both the top and bottom, and was completely swept away with only the basement left behind. Despite the high-quality construction, the overall context surrounding this home was not indicative of an intensity greater than mid-range EF4, and maximum winds along this segment of the path were estimated to have peaked at 180 mph (290 km/h).

 
The tornado weakened to high-end EF2 strength as it crossed Country Road 906, destroying a garage and collapsing the exterior walls of a residence. As the tornado continued through sparsely populated areas further to the northeast, it produced a mixture of EF2 and EF3 damage to homes. A few homes along this portion of the path were left with only a single interior room standing, and multiple outbuildings were destroyed. Large hay bales from one of the outbuildings were thrown up to 50 yards away. As the tornado crossed the Mississippi River into Illinois, trees along the riverbank were shredded and debarked. Once in Illinois, the tornado continued at EF2 strength as it passed south of Rockwood, snapping hundreds of trees and a few power poles. A house at the edge of the damage path sustained EF0 roof damage. Past Rockwood, the tornado tore through the Shawnee National Forest, downing thousands of trees at EF1 to EF2 strength as it continued to the northeast. EF1 and EF2 damage continued to the south of Ava, as numerous trees were snapped and uprooted and several outbuildings were completely destroyed. East of Ava, many trees, mobile homes, and frame homes sustained considerable damage, and additional outbuildings were destroyed as damage continued to range from EF1 to EF2 in intensity. The tornado then narrowly missed the town of Vergennes to the south, completely destroying a house at EF3 intensity. Outbuildings and large grain silos were destroyed, and trees and power poles were snapped just south of town as well.

Continuing northeastward past Vergennes, EF2 damage occurred as a small home was largely destroyed, power poles were snapped, outbuildings were destroyed, an antenna was bent, and a dump truck was flipped over. EF2 damage continued as the tornado clipped the northern fringes of Elkville, with multiple homes and outbuildings severely damaged or destroyed in that area. The Powerade Park baseball field complex was also damaged, and many trees were snapped. EF1 damage to trees was observed further to the northeast as the tornado traversed unpopulated swampy areas. The tornado passed south of Campbell Lake and then moved into Franklin County, where it dramatically re-intensified to high-end EF3 strength as it crossed Illinois Route 184. A farmhouse at this location was obliterated and swept cleanly away, with the debris shredded and scattered  downwind. National Weather Service damage surveyors were unable to recover anything larger than a few wooden 2x4s and some pieces of siding downwind from the foundation. Nearby trees were snapped and denuded as well. Due to the intensity of the damage, the damage at this location was initially assigned an EF4 rating. However, further surveys revealed that the home was not attached to its cinder block foundation, and the rating was subsequently decreased to high-end EF3. Beyond this point, the tornado weakened to EF1 intensity and caused moderate damage to some homes and outbuildings before it lifted at 02:57 UTC (8:57 p.m. CST) to the southwest of Christopher. In addition to the one fatality, twelve people were injured.

Crossville, Illinois – Oakland City, Indiana

A tornado touched down just northeast of Carmi in White County, Illinois at 03:54 UTC on March 1 (9:54 p.m. CST), snapping the trunks of hardwood trees at EF1 strength. It rapidly intensified to EF3 strength farther to the east as it crossed Illinois Route 1, completely destroying a single-wide mobile home and rolling four to five vehicles. A small brick outbuilding nearby was severely damaged, a double-wide mobile home was obliterated and several power poles were snapped in this area as well. The tornado then crossed 1675 East Street and North 1750 East Street, narrowly missing the city of Crossville, Illinois to the south. Just past 1800 East Street, one small barn storing farm equipment was decimated while a larger outbuilding had its main support beams break loose from the concrete pads, forcing the roof beams to buckle. Damage to these structures was rated EF2. Another large barn nearby was severely damaged and a small brick outbuilding was destroyed, with damage to those structures rated EF1.

Farther along the path, the tornado re-intensified to EF3 strength as it crossed at the North 1935 East Road and East 1975 North Road intersection to the north of Phillipstown. The old part of a home, which had to be rebuilt after being hit by the 1925 Tri-State tornado, was destroyed while the newer part of the structure was damaged. A vehicle from this residence was thrown . Several other structures in this area sustained EF2 damage, including a house that had its roof torn off, two double-wide mobile homes that were destroyed with nearby vehicles displaced, and an outbuilding that was completely destroyed. A house at the edge of the circulation had some of its metal roofing removed as well. The tornado continued towards the Wabash River, downing numerous trees at EF1 intensity as it moved through unpopulated areas. In total, 35 structures were damaged in the county.

The tornado crossed the Wabash River into Posey County, Indiana and restrengthened to EF2 intensity, obliterating two metal barns. It veered east-southeast but quickly back east-northeast, causing severe damage to many hardwood trees along its path. Southeast of Griffin, a free-standing light pole was collapsed. The storm narrowed after crossing Interstate 64, but continued to produce EF2 damage to a barn that was flattened. Along Pumpkin Run Road, multiple power poles were snapped, while along Murphy Road, a residence sustained damage to its roof. A nearby house was completely shifted off its foundation, with nearby hardwood trees snapped and uprooted. As the tornado passed north of Poseyville into Gibson County, wooden power poles were snapped and large amounts of debris was strewn throughout a treeline along Indiana State Road 165. A pocket of EF3 damage was noted as a metal building was totally destroyed with its foundation swept clean. Cars at the structure were tossed , 6x6 poles were snapped at the concrete, and two double-wide mobile homes were destroyed with their metal frames tossed . An anchor-bolted frame home had one of its walls, its windows, and its stella doors blown out. Another nearby home had a large section of its roof ripped off, sustaining EF2 damage. Along South County Road 1075 West, EF2 damage continued as power poles were snapped, a mobile home was destroyed, and hundreds of trees were snapped and uprooted. Continuing northeast, a steel barn was destroyed and hundreds of additional trees were snapped. The tornado then produced another area of EF3 damage as it destroyed a brick home. The house had its roof ripped off, exterior walls collapsed, and had its attached garage destroyed. An occupant of this home was left trapped in the debris after the tornado and had to be dug out.

Farther along the path, the tornado weakened back to EF2 strength as a residence to the southeast of Owensville had its entire roof destroyed and sustained damage to its concrete block walls, while several nearby outbuildings were damaged. EF2 damage continued as it crossed Indiana State Road 168 to the west of Fort Branch, tearing off large sections of roof from homes and crumpling large grain bins. The tornado weakened as it affected areas just north of Fort Branch, but still caused considerable high-end EF1 roof damage to several homes and downed many trees. To the northeast of Fort Branch, EF1 damage continued as homes sustained roof damage, including a brick home that lost about 1/4 of its roof. A metal building had part of its roof ripped off and walls pushed in along South County Road 550 East, while a final pocket of EF2 damage was noted farther along the path just west of Interstate 69, where a barn was completely destroyed. The final observed damage was to a barn south of Oakland City that had half of its roof torn off and gable blown out at 04:45 UTC (10:45 p.m. CST), marking an end to the tornado's 44.6 mi (71.8 km) path. Damage to this last structure was rated EF1. In all, 106 structures were damaged in Gibson County, of which 33 suffered minimal damage, 26 suffered minor damage, 21 suffered major damage, and 26 were destroyed. One person was killed, and two others were injured by this tornado, all in Illinois.

See also
 List of North American tornadoes and tornado outbreaks
 Tornado outbreak of March 2–3, 2012 – An early March outbreak which produced multiple long-tracked and destructive tornadoes across the Ohio Valley
 Tornado outbreak of March 6–7, 2017 – A less severe tornado outbreak that affected similar areas just one week later

Footnotes

References

External links
Outbreak summaries from regional National Weather Service offices:

Springfield, Missouri, WFO
St. Louis, Missouri, WFO
Quad Cities, IA/IL, WFO
Lincoln, Illinois, WFO
Chicago, Illinois, WFO
Indianapolis, Indiana, WFO
Northern Indiana, WFO
Wilmington, Ohio, WFO
Louisville, Kentucky, WFO
Paducah, Kentucky, WFO
Little Rock, Arkansas, WFO
Memphis, Tennessee, WFO
Nashville, Tennessee, WFO
Atlanta, Georgia, WFO

2016–17 North American winter
Tornado outbreak of February 28 - March 1, 2017
Tornado outbreak of February 28 - March 1, 2017
Tornado outbreak of February 28 - March 1, 2017
Tornado outbreak of February 28 - March 1, 2017
Tornado outbreak of February 28 - March 1, 2017
Tornado outbreak of February 28 - March 1, 2017
Tornado outbreak
Tornado outbreak
Tornadoes of 2017
F4 tornadoes by date
 ,2017-02-28